Mathieu Olivier (born February 11, 1997) is an American-born Canadian professional ice hockey right winger currently under contract to the Columbus Blue Jackets of the National Hockey League (NHL).

Olivier is notably the first Mississippi-born player in NHL history, as well as the first player born in the Gulf Coast region to play for the Predators.

Early life
Olivier was born on February 11, 1997, in Biloxi, Mississippi while his father Simon was playing in the ECHL. He lived in Mississippi for three months before moving to various cities and countries including Canada, Germany, Oklahoma City, and Houston while his father played hockey. He attended kindergarten in Germany and picked up the language before moving back to his family's native Quebec.

Playing career

Major Junior
Growing up in Quebec, Olivier as a youth played with the Lévis Commandeurs in the Quebec Junior AAA Hockey League (QMAAA) before he was selected by the Moncton Wildcats in the 2013 Quebec Major Junior Hockey League (QMJHL) Entry Draft. His tenure with the Wildcats only lasted one and a half seasons, however, as he was traded to the Shawinigan Cataractes for a 3rd round pick in December 2014. At the time of the trade, Olivier had accumulated 21 points through 86 games. Upon joining the Cataractes, Olivier player in the QMJHL's first Winter Classic and scored a goal in the 4–2 win over the Victoriaville Tigres.

Prior to the start of the 2015–16 season, Olivier was named an assistant captain alongside Alex Pawelczyk, Zachary Taylor, Alexis D'Aoust, and Giovanni Fiore. In this role, he helped lead the team to the President's Cup Finals before they were eliminated by the Rouyn-Noranda Huskies.

On the opening night of 2017–18 QMJHL training camps, Olivier was traded to the Sherbrooke Phoenix in exchange for two picks in the 2020 draft. By February 2018, Olivier has tallied 42 points with the Phoenix while also serving as an alternate captain. As a result of his play over his five seasons in the QMJHL, Olivier signed his first professional contract with the Milwaukee Admirals of the American Hockey League (AHL) on February 19, 2018. Following the singing, he remained with the Phoenix and helped them reach the second round of the post-season by recording six points through 10 games. As a result of his play during the regular and post-season, Olivier received the teams' MVP and Fan Favourite Award.

Professional
Upon concluding his major junior career, Olivier attended the Nashville Predators Development Camp and Prospects Showcase ahead of the 2018–19 season. In his first professional season, Olivier tallied four goals and 12 points through 54 games while also leading the AHL with 9 fights. As such, he was re-signed by the Predators to a two-year, entry-level contract for the 2019–20 and 2020–21 seasons.

Reassigned to continue his tenure with the Admirals to start the 2019–20 season, Olivier had 7 points in 17 games before earning his first recall to the Predators on November 18, 2019. He made his NHL debut, appearing on the fourth-line with the Predators in a 2–1 defeat to the Winnipeg Jets on November 19, 2019.

Following his fourth season within the Predators organization, Olivier was traded to the Columbus Blue Jackets in exchange for a fourth-round pick in 2022 on July 1, 2022.

Career statistics

References

External links

1997 births
Living people
Canadian ice hockey forwards
Columbus Blue Jackets players
Milwaukee Admirals players
Moncton Wildcats players
Nashville Predators players
Shawinigan Cataractes players
Sherbrooke Phoenix players
Undrafted National Hockey League players
Sportspeople from Biloxi, Mississippi
Ice hockey people from Mississippi